Go is a 2001 coming-of-age movie, directed by Isao Yukisada, based on Kazuki Kaneshiro's novel of the same title, which tells the story of a Japanese-born North Korean teenager Sugihara (Kubozuka Yōsuke) and a prejudiced Japanese girl Tsubaki Sakurai (Kō Shibasaki) whom he falls for.

Plot
Third-generation Korean, Sugihara, is a student at a Japanese high school after graduating from a North Korean junior high school in Japan. His father runs a back-alley shop that specializes in exchanging pachinko-earned goods for cash, which is stereotypically a "common" Zainichi occupation. His father had long supported North Korea, but he obtained South Korean nationality to go sightseeing in Hawaii, which required a South Korean passport.

Sugihara's school days are filled with fights that always result in his victory; he and his delinquent peers fill the rest of their time with all kinds of mischief. His best friend, Jong-Il is a Korean high-school student who had been his classmate in junior high. When Sugihara decided to leave Korean schools for a Japanese high school, their classroom teacher called him a traitor to their homeland. However, Jong-Il supported Sugihara by saying: “We never have had what you call homeland.”

One day, Sugihara attends the birthday party of one of his friends and meets a mysterious Japanese girl whose family name is Sakurai (she is reluctant to use her first name). He takes her out on a couple of dates and they gradually become intimate. However, tragedy strikes when Jong-Il is stabbed to death by a Japanese youth at a railway station. Jong-Il mistakenly thought that the youth was about to attack a female Korean student at the station. The boy, who is carrying a knife, attacks and kills Jong-Il. Sakurai comforts Sugihara, and that night they attempt to make love. She freezes in bed, however, when Sugihara confesses that he is Korean. She declares that she is afraid of a non-Japanese male entering her, and Sugihara leaves.

In the meantime, Sugihara's father has been depressed by the news that his younger brother died in North Korea. In an attempt to provoke him, Sugihara blames his father, stating that the second generation of Zainichi, with its sentimentality and powerlessness, has caused the Zainichi much grief and difficulty. They fistfight, and the result is Sugihara's complete defeat. In the wake of the fight, Sugihara finds out that the true reason for his father's adopting South Korean nationality was that he wanted to make his son's life easier.

Six months later, on Christmas Eve, Sugihara is studying hard in preparation for the college entrance examinations. He is trying to fulfill the wishes of the deceased Jong-Il, who always wanted him to go to a (presumably Japanese) university. Sakurai calls him after a long period of silence between them and asks him to come to the place where they had their first date. In this last scene, they recover mutual affection and leave for some unknown place together in a light snowfall.

Cast
 Yōsuke Kubozuka as Sugihara (杉原)
 Ko Shibasaki as Sakurai Tsubaki (桜井椿)
 Shinobu Ōtake as Michiko (道子; mother of Sugihara)
 Tsutomu Yamazaki as Hideyoshi (秀吉; father of Sugihara)
 Hirofumi Arai as Won-su (원수/ウォンス)
 Mitsu Murata as Katō (加藤)
 Takato Hosoyamada as Jeong-il (정일/チョンイル)
 Min Kim as Naomi (나오미/ナオミ)
 Gye-nam Myeong as Staff member of South Korean embassy
 Tarō Yamamoto as Tawake (タワケ)
 Ren Osugi as Taxi driver
 Sansei Shiomi as Mr. Kim (김 씨/キムさん)
 Masato Hagiwara as Policeman
 Anri Ban as Kaori (카오리/香織)
 Asami Mizukawa as Korean in the tube station

Production

The film is based on a novel by Kazuki Kaneshiro, a Zainichi Korean himself,  also entitled Go. It was published in 2000 by Kodansha, and received a Naoki Prize.

Reception

The film received a simultaneous theatrical release in Japan and South Korea, and was the first joint Japanese and South Korean production. It was also the first major film to challenge existing preconceptions about Japanese identity within the commercial format of a young adult romance film. The film explores not just the issue of prejudice, reflected in Sakurai's unconscious racism, but that of racial identity in general.

The film has received some criticism for its focus on racism that its protagonist experiences, in comparison to the deeply ingrained and institutionalized racism, ensuring that even after several generations of residence, many Koreans are still refused Japanese passports.

Other Japanese films have also tackled the issue of prejudice in Japan, usually treating Koreans as the victims, such as Nagisa Oshima's Death by Hanging and Kohei Oguri's For Kayoko. All Under the Moon is another film with a Zainichi Korean director, and treats the Zainichi Korean ethnicity as a condition.

In playing the role of Sugihara, actor Yōsuke Kubozuka comments on his experience, “In GO, Korean Japanese Sugihara’s identity was born because of the system of the society. Since I was born in Japan and I have been taking it for granted, I didn’t think about it.”

Before playing Sugihara in the film, he was surrounded by an environment where everyone is Japanese and everyone takes that for granted. But after knowing the other in his own society, he internalized the nationalistic sentiments of the Japanese.  Having discovered himself as nationalist, Kubozuka tried to rebel against what he sees as “uncool Japan” that doesn't have its own pride at all.  In 2002, he produced a movie named Kyouki no Sakura or Madness in Bloom, in which he acted a role of young nationalistic neo-Nazi in Tokyo.

Themes

The central theme of the film is the integration problems of Zainichi Koreans and also the problematic struggle between the transfer of the North Korean citizenship (Chousen-jin) to the South Korean citizenship (Kankoku-jin) that allows for a person to be more free in Japanese society.  
Go (Yōsuke Kubozuka) is also faced with the dilemma of falling in love with a Japanese girl whose family values are placed against the favor of Korean-blooded citizens, and faces the realized boundaries between the seemingly non-existent yet realistically affective ideology of "citizenship" in the Japanese society/culture. Thematically the Director Yukisada Isao and writer Kazuki Kaneshiro plays with the traditional Japanese racism that Koreans face. Yukisada Isao often allows elements such as "love" and "friendship" to take a romantic protagonistic role to ring out over the given antagonistic backdrop set up in this particular film.

It is also a social commentary on its contradictory backwardness of Japan as a society that plays a role in such a forth-playing manner at the world stage. Go is also mentally attached to traditional Japanese values and listens to "Rakugo", which is an ancient form of Japanese standup comedy. Since he is a North Korean boy that was born and raised in Japan, he faces problems of self-identity and belongingness to a certain culture where the culture that nourished him is the exact element that counteracts to work against him. These complicated issues are then drowned out by Yukisada's portrayal of the importance of the short sighted nature of true friendship and true love that in the end renders the concept of nationality as relatively irrelevant to one's own lifestyle and beliefs in a given perspective.

Awards
The film has received numerous awards.
 2001 – Hochi Film Awards – Best Film
 2001 – Nikkan Sports Film Awards – Best Director; Best New Talent
 2002 – Japanese Academy Prize – Best Cinematography; Best Director; Best Editing; Best Lighting; Best Screenplay; Outstanding Performance by an Actor in a Leading Role; Newcomer of the Year
 2002 – Blue Ribbon Awards – Best Director
 2002 – Kinema Junpo – Best Director; Best Film; Best Screenplay
 2002 – Mainichi Film Concours – Best Screenplay; Sponichi Grand Prize New Talent Award (Yōsuke Kubozuka and Kō Shibasaki)
 2002 – International Film Festival of Marrakech – Best Actor; Golden Star (Isao Yukisada)
 2002 – Palm Springs International Film Festival – FIPRESCI Prize (Isao Yukisada)
 2002 – Yokohama Film Festival – Best Director; Best Film; Best Screenplay

References

External links
 
 Go at the Japanese Movie Database

2001 films
2000s coming-of-age films
2000s Japanese-language films
Japanese coming-of-age films
Best Film Kinema Junpo Award winners
Films about race and ethnicity
Films directed by Isao Yukisada
2000s Japanese films